Even in the Midst... is the fourth album from the American instrumental math rock band Ahleuchatistas. Released in 2007, it is their last album to feature drummer Sean Dail.

Track listing

Personnel

Derek Poteat – bass
Shane Perlowin – guitar
Sean Dail – drums

Notes 

2007 albums
Ahleuchatistas albums